Two ships of the Royal Norwegian Navy have borne the name HNoMS Tjeld or Kjell (archaic spelling), after the Eurasian oystercatcher:

  was a  launched in 1912, captured by the Germans in 1940 and sunk by British aircraft in 1944.
  was a  launched in 1978 and sold for scrapping in 1992.

Royal Norwegian Navy ship names